B. L. W. Fernando was the 31st Auditor General of Ceylon. He was appointed on 21 February 1964, succeeding D. S. De Silva, and held the office until 15 August 1969. He was succeeded by D. R. Settinayake.

References

Auditors General of Sri Lanka